Glittertind or Glittertinden is a mountain in Lom Municipality in Innlandet county, Norway. It is located in the Jotunheimen mountains within Jotunheimen National Park. The mountain is surrounded by several other notable mountains including Trollsteineggje, Trollsteinrundhøe, and Svartholshøe to the north; Grotbreahesten to the northeast; Veslekjølen to the east; Austre Hestlægerhøe and Nautgardstinden to the southeast; Steinbukampen and Veopallan to the south; and Galdhøpiggen to the west.

Height
The mountain reaches an elevation of  without the glacier on top of its peak. But in August 2022, the mountain was seen basically without the glacier.

In a 1917 official map, the mountain was indicated to be . So it was a matter of defining a glacier as a part of a mountain or not. The glacier has, however, shrunk in recent years, and the dispute has been settled in Galdhøpiggen's favour. The summit of Glittertind was reached for the first time in 1841 by Harald Nicolai Storm Wergeland and Hans Sletten.

Access
The hike from Glitterheim is the easier, but Glitterheim is inside the Jotunheimen National Park and can therefore only be reached by foot. The summit hike is a very popular one, only surpassed in seasonal numbers by Galdhøpiggen, its western neighbor.

The route across the glacier that crowns the summit is completely without crevasses, but on a hot summer day it might be a wet hike across the melting snow which covers the ice. Visitors might even experience that the meltwater blows up across the summit, leaving hikers soaked. The view is magnificent. East and southeast of Glittertind there are hardly any high peaks, and hence most of the northern and eastern parts of Innlandet can be seen. All famous photos of Glittertind are taken on the eastern flank slightly below the top.

There used to be a cabin at the summit, but because of the impossibility of mooring it sufficiently, it was knocked down by a storm and landed on the Grjotbreen glacier, under the steep north wall of the summit.

Name
The mountain is named after the river Glitra and the last element is the finite form of tind (m) which means 'mountain peak'. The name of the river is derived from the verb glitre which means 'glitter' or 'sparkle'.

Media gallery

See also
List of mountains of Norway by height

References

Footnotes

Further reading

Lom, Norway
Mountains of Innlandet
Jotunheimen